NGC 314 is a lenticular galaxy in the constellation Sculptor. It was discovered on September 27, 1834 by John Herschel.

References

0314
18340927
Sculptor (constellation)
Lenticular galaxies
003395